Make Me an Offer is a 1952 comedy novel by the British writer Wolf Mankowitz. It was his debut novel and was a success. The plot revolves around an antique dealer. It was published in the United States by Dutton. He followed it up with another success A Kid for Two Farthings in 1953.

Film adaptation
In 1954 it was made into the British film Make Me an Offer directed by Cyril Frankel and starring Peter Finch, Adrienne Corri and Finlay Currie.

References

Bibliography
 Gale, Steven H. Encyclopedia of British Humorists: Geoffrey Chaucer to John Cleese, Volume 1. 
 Goble, Alan. The Complete Index to Literary Sources in Film. Walter de Gruyter, 1999.

1952 British novels
Comedy novels
Novels set in England
British novels adapted into films
André Deutsch books
Novels by Wolf Mankowitz